Salur mandal is one of the 34 mandals in Parvathipuram Manyam district of the Indian state of Andhra Pradesh. It is administration under Parvathipuram revenue division and headquartered at Salur. The mandal is bounded by Makkuva, Ramabhadrapuram, Pachipenta and Bobbili mandals. A portion of it also borders the state of Odisha.

Demographics 

 census, the mandal had a population of 101,386. The total population constitute, 49,731 males and 51,655 females.

Government and politics 

Salur mandal is one of the four mandals in Salur (Assembly constituency), which in turn is a part of Araku (Lok Sabha constituency), one of the 25 Lok Sabha constituencies representing Andhra Pradesh. The present MLA is Rajanna Dora Peedika, who won the Andhra Pradesh Legislative Assembly election, 2014 representing YSR Congress Party.

Towns and villages 

 2011 census of India, the mandal has 89 settlements. It includes 1 town and 88 villages.

The settlements in the mandal are listed below:

Note: M-Municipality

References

External links

Mandals in Vizianagaram district